Harold Sinclair may refer to:

 Harold Sinclair, see fluid coupling
 Harold A. Sinclair, actor

See also
Harry Sinclair (disambiguation)